Istituto Scolastico Italiano "Giovan Battista Hodierna" or the Istituto Scolastico Italiano di Tunisi is a private Italian international school in El Menzah, Tunis, Tunisia. 

The school was founded in 1966 as the Scuola Italiana di Tunisi. It serves preschool, primary school, lower secondary school, and upper secondary school. The school is located in a three-storey building.

References

External links
  Istituto Scolastico Italiano "Giovan Battista Hodierna"

Schools in Tunis
Italian international schools in Tunisia
1966 establishments in Tunisia
Educational institutions established in 1966